Crynculus is a genus of crickets in family Gryllidae.

Taxonomy
The genus contains the following species:
Crynculus schmalfussi Gorochov, 1996

References

Gryllinae
Orthoptera genera